Quaintance is a surname. Notable people with the surname include:

 Altus Lacy Quaintance (1870–1958), American entomologist
 George Quaintance (1902–1957), American artist

See also
 Quaintance Block